Yang Yi may refer to:

Yang Yi (Shu Han) (died 235), official of Shu Han
Yang Yi (translator) (1919–2023), Chinese literary translator
Yang Yi (table tennis) (born 1952), Chinese para table tennis player
Yang Yi (author) (born 1964), Chinese-born Japanese writer
Tavia Yeung (born 1979), Hong Kong actress